Aleksei Sergeyevich Kandalintsev (born 6 February 1976) is a Russian professional football official and a former player. He is the general director for FC SKA-Khabarovsk.

Club career
He played 8 seasons in the Russian Football National League for FC SKA Khabarovsk and FC Tom Tomsk.

References

External links

1976 births
Sportspeople from Khabarovsk
Living people
Russian footballers
Association football midfielders
FC Tom Tomsk players
FC SKA-Khabarovsk players
FC Smena Komsomolsk-na-Amure players